The Harvard–Yenching Institute is an independent foundation dedicated to advancing higher education in Asia in the humanities and social sciences, with special attention to the study of Asian culture.  It traditionally had close ties to Harvard University and the now-defunct Yenching University, and its offices are located on the Harvard campus in Cambridge, Massachusetts, but it is not part of Harvard.

History 
The Harvard–Yenching Institute (HYI) was founded in 1928 by Yenching University President John Leighton Stuart with funding provided solely from the estate of Charles Martin Hall, the inventor of a process for refining aluminum and the founder of the Aluminum Company of America (ALCOA). Although the institute has close ties with Harvard University, it is a legally and fiscally independent public charitable trust. Hall's charge to the trustees of his estate was to promote higher education in Asia, and to that end the trustees of his estate partnered with Harvard University in order to fulfill the Harvard–Yenching Institute's mission as stated in its Articles of Incorporation:

In the 1930s, the institute supported the development of what became the department of East Asian Languages and Civilizations at Harvard and founded the Harvard-Yenching Library as well as the Harvard Journal of Asiatic Studies. During the 1930s and 40s, the institute provided direct support to Yenching University in Peiping (Peking), because of its focus on the humanities, along with five other colleges in China, University of Nanking (Nanking), Fukien Christian University (Foochow), Lingnan University (Guangzhou),  Cheeloo University (Tsinan) and West China Union University (Chengtu), and Allahabad Agricultural Institute in India.

Since the 1950s, the institute's core activity has been to offer fellowships for overseas study and research to younger doctoral and post-doctoral scholars at leading East and Southeast Asian universities in all fields of the humanities and social sciences. Although the institute has a special commitment to promoting the study of Asian culture, its support is not limited to that field. To date over 1000 faculty from Asia have received Institute fellowships and over 300 doctoral students have received their degrees with Institute support. In addition to providing fellowships, the institute supports publications through Harvard's Monograph Series as well as overseas publications in Chinese and Vietnamese, conferences, workshops and training programs.

Management 
The Harvard–Yenching Institute has a nine-member board of directors, consisting of three each representing Harvard University and the United Board for Christian Higher Education in Asia, and three independent members with significant experience in Asia. In addition, a HYI Faculty Advisory Committee functions as an informal advisory group to the director, offering general advice on institute operations and academic directions. In its 80 years, the Harvard–Yenching Institute has had seven directors, each a member of the faculty of Harvard University:

Directors 
 Serge Elisséeff (1934–1956)
 Edwin O. Reischauer (1956–1964)
 Glen Baxter, Acting Director (1961–1964)
 John Pelzel (1964–1975)
 Albert M. Craig (1976–1986)
 Patrick Hanan (1987–1995)
 Tu Wei-ming (1996–2008)
 Elizabeth J. Perry (2008-)

Fellowship Programs 
The Harvard–Yenching Institute has several fellowship programs that bring scholars from Asia to conduct research at Harvard University, to participate in special training programs, or to attend graduate school at Harvard University as well as other universities in the U.S. and abroad. The fellowship programs include:

 Associate Program
 Coordinate Research Program
 NUS-HYI Joint Scholarship
 Regional Studies – East Asia Program
 Training programs
 Visiting Scholars Program
 Visiting Fellows Program

References

External links 

 

Harvard University
Yenching University
Research institutes of Sinology